Florea is a genus of crested millipedes in the family Tynommatidae. There is one described species, Florea sinuata.

References

Callipodida